Estádio Municipal Irmão Gino Maria Rossi, commonly known as Manduzão, is a multi-use stadium in Pouso Alegre, Minas Gerais, Brazil. It is used mostly for football matches, and has a maximum capacity of 26,000 people.

Inaugurated in 1997, the stadium was formerly known as Estádio Municipal de Pouso Alegre. It had its record attendance on 27 August 2022, when Pouso Alegre defeated ASA 1–0 in the 2022 Série D semifinals.

References

Football venues in Minas Gerais
Pouso Alegre Futebol Clube
Sports venues in Minas Gerais